Hadley Caliman is the eponymous debut album recorded by American saxophonist Hadley Caliman in 1971 for the Mainstream label.

Reception 

AllMusic states "Despite the fact that this isn't the most fully confident release in Caliman's Mainstream catalog it is noteworthy for introducing a very solid and creative voice on the tenor horn ... If it has any real faults, it's ultimately that the leader proves too democratic at his own expense. This serves as an introduction to a fine re-appraisal of one of jazz's more forgotten talents".

Track listing 
All compositions by Hadley Caliman except where noted.
 "Cigar Eddie" – 6:25
 "Comencio" – 7:40
 "Little One" – 4:44
 "Blues for L. L." (Larry Vuckovich) – 8:40
 "Kickin' on the Inside" – 4:50
 "Longing" (Vuckovich) – 2:46

Personnel 
Hadley Caliman – tenor saxophone, flute
Larry Vuckovich – piano
John White Jr. – guitar
Bill Douglas – bass
Clarence Becton – drums

References 

1971 debut albums
Mainstream Records albums
Albums produced by Bob Shad